Starting back in 2005, the Mouth of the Tyne Festival takes place every July for a weekend of live music and international street theatre in the village of Tynemouth. The festival used to take place on both sides of the Tyne but has made Tynemouth its home for many years now. It consists of spectacular outdoor music concerts at Tynemouth Priory and Castle, cultural performances and a pageant. Activities also take place at Tynemouth Station and the Playhouse Whitley Bay.

Organised by North Tyneside Council, the 2019 festival was a sell-out featuring Sam Fender, Jack Savoretti, Rick Astley and the Proclaimers, though would be the last festival to go ahead for two years due to Covid. The 2022 festival was scheduled for 8 to 10 July 2022 at Tynemouth Priory and Castle, with headliners including Keane, Lighthouse Family, Sophie Ellis-Bextor announced for the main three-day event and John Cale at the Playhouse on Monday 18 July. One month before the festival was due to take place, Saturday night headliners the Lighthouse Family announced that they had split up and would no longer be touring. As of 7 June 2022, the organisers, North Tyneside Council, were looking for an alternative headliner, even though Saturday's line-up had been taken off their official website at mouthofthetynefestival.com. In addition North Tyneside Council said ticketholders could get refunds for Saturday's show.

Affiliations 
The Mouth of the Tyne Festival is organised by North Tyneside Council.

Line-up 2014 

 Nadine Shah
 Midlake
 John Cooper Clark
 Lawson
 Paul Weller

Line-up 2015 

 Paul Heaton & Jacqui Abbott
 Jack Savoretti
 The Specials
 Martha Reeves & The Vandellas

Line-up 2016 

 Bryan Ferry
 Nadine Shah
 Will Young
 Tunde Baiyewu
 James Bay
 Tom Smith
 Lulu
 Lemar

Line-up 2017 

Laura Marling
Elbow
Tom Odell
Billy Ocean

Line-up 2018 
Paloma Faith
James Arthur
Gabrielle Aplin
Paul Heaton & Jacqui Abbott
Beverley Knight
Collabro

Line-up 2019 
Sam Fender
Little Comets
Rachel Chinouriri
Jack Savoretti
The Wandering Hearts
Rick Astley
The Proclaimers
Jack Lukeman
Robert Vincent
Nadine Shah
Ruby Turner

Line-up 2022 
 Keane
 Eliza Shaddad
 Sophie Ellis-Bextor 
 Newton Faulkner
 John Cale (performing at the Playhouse Whitley Bay)

Line-up 2023
 Siouxsie on Friday 7 July
 Gabrielle on Sunday 9 July

External links
 Official website

References 

Music festivals in Tyne and Wear
Tynemouth